A crystal radio receiver, also called a crystal set, is a simple radio receiver, popular in the early days of radio. It uses only the power of the received radio signal to produce sound, needing no external power. It is named for its most important component, a crystal detector, originally made from a piece of crystalline mineral such as galena. This component is now called a diode.

Crystal radios are the simplest type of radio receiver and can be made with a few inexpensive parts, such as a wire for an antenna,  a coil of wire, a capacitor, a crystal detector, and earphones (because a crystal set has insufficient power for a loudspeaker).  However they are passive receivers, while other radios use an amplifier powered by current from a battery or wall outlet to make the radio signal louder. Thus, crystal sets produce rather weak sound and must be listened to with sensitive earphones, and can receive stations only within a limited range of the transmitter.

The rectifying property of a contact between a mineral and a metal was discovered in 1874 by Karl Ferdinand Braun. Crystals were first used as a detector of radio waves in 1894 by Jagadish Chandra Bose, in his microwave optics experiments.  They were first used as a demodulator for radio communication reception in 1902 by G. W. Pickard. Crystal radios were the first widely used type of radio receiver, and the main type used during the wireless telegraphy era. Sold and homemade by the millions, the inexpensive and reliable crystal radio was a major driving force in the introduction of radio to the public, contributing to the development of radio as an entertainment medium with the beginning of radio broadcasting around 1920.

Around 1920, crystal sets were superseded by the first amplifying receivers, which used vacuum tubes.  With this technological advance, crystal sets became obsolete for commercial use but continued to be built by hobbyists, youth groups, and the Boy Scouts mainly as a way of learning about the technology of radio. They are still sold as educational devices, and there are groups of enthusiasts devoted to their construction.

Crystal radios receive amplitude modulated (AM) signals, although FM designs have been built.   They can be designed to receive almost any radio frequency band, but most receive the AM broadcast band. A few receive  shortwave bands, but strong signals are required.  The first crystal sets received wireless telegraphy signals broadcast by spark-gap transmitters at frequencies as low as 20 kHz.

History 

Crystal radio was invented by a long, partly obscure chain of discoveries in the late 19th century that gradually evolved into more and more practical radio receivers in the early 20th century. The earliest practical use of crystal radio was to receive Morse code radio signals transmitted from spark-gap transmitters by early amateur radio experimenters. As electronics evolved, the ability to send voice signals by radio caused a technological explosion around 1920 that evolved into today's radio broadcasting industry.

Early years 

Early radio telegraphy used spark gap and arc transmitters as well as high-frequency alternators running at radio frequencies. The coherer was the first means of detecting a radio signal. These, however, lacked the sensitivity to detect weak signals.

In the early 20th century, various researchers discovered that certain metallic minerals, such as galena, could be used to detect radio signals.

Indian physicist Jagadish Chandra Bose was first to use a crystal as a radio wave detector, using galena detectors to receive microwaves starting around 1894. In 1901, Bose filed for a U.S. patent for "A Device for Detecting Electrical Disturbances" that mentioned the use of a galena crystal; this was granted in 1904, #755840.   On August 30, 1906, Greenleaf Whittier Pickard filed a patent for a silicon crystal detector, which was granted on November 20, 1906.

A crystal detector includes a crystal, usually a thin wire or metal probe that contacts the crystal, and the stand or enclosure that holds those components in place. The most common crystal used is a small piece of galena; pyrite was also often used, as it was a more easily adjusted and stable mineral, and quite sufficient for urban signal strengths. Several other minerals also performed well as detectors. Another benefit of crystals was that they could demodulate amplitude modulated signals. This device brought radiotelephones and voice broadcast to a public audience. Crystal sets represented an inexpensive and technologically simple method of receiving these signals at a time when the embryonic radio broadcasting industry was beginning to grow.

1920s and 1930s 
In 1922 the (then named) US Bureau of Standards released a publication entitled Construction and Operation of a Simple Homemade Radio Receiving Outfit. This article showed how almost any family having a member who was handy with simple tools could make a radio and tune into weather, crop prices, time, news and the opera. This design was significant in bringing radio to the general public. NBS followed that with a more selective two-circuit version, Construction and Operation of a Two-Circuit Radio Receiving Equipment With Crystal Detector, which was published the same year  and is still frequently built by enthusiasts today.

In the beginning of the 20th century, radio had little commercial use, and radio experimentation was a hobby for many people. Some historians consider the autumn of 1920 to be the beginning of commercial radio broadcasting for entertainment purposes. Pittsburgh station KDKA, owned by Westinghouse, received its license from the United States Department of Commerce just in time to broadcast the Harding-Cox presidential election returns. In addition to reporting on special events, broadcasts to farmers of crop price reports were an important public service in the early days of radio.

In 1921, factory-made radios were very expensive. Since less-affluent families could not afford to own one, newspapers and magazines carried articles on how to build a crystal radio with common household items. To minimize the cost, many of the plans suggested winding the tuning coil on empty pasteboard containers such as oatmeal boxes, which became a common foundation for homemade radios.

Crystodyne 
In early 1920s Russia, Oleg Losev was experimenting with applying voltage biases to various kinds of crystals for the manufacturing of radio detectors. The result was astonishing: with a zincite (zinc oxide) crystal he gained amplification. This was a negative resistance phenomenon, decades before the development of the tunnel diode. After the first experiments, Losev built regenerative and superheterodyne receivers, and even transmitters.

A crystodyne could be produced under primitive conditions; it could be made in a rural forge, unlike vacuum tubes and modern semiconductor devices. However, this discovery was not supported by the authorities and was soon forgotten; no device was produced in mass quantity beyond a few examples for research.

"Foxhole radios" 

In addition to mineral crystals, the oxide coatings of many metal surfaces act as semiconductors (detectors) capable of rectification. Crystal radios have been improvised using detectors made from rusty nails, corroded pennies, and many other common objects.

When Allied troops were halted near Anzio, Italy during the spring of 1944, powered personal radio receivers were strictly prohibited as the Germans had equipment that could detect the local oscillator signal of superheterodyne receivers.  Crystal sets lack power driven local oscillators, hence they could not be detected. Some resourceful soldiers constructed "crystal" sets from discarded materials to listen to news and music. One type used a blue steel razor blade and a pencil lead for a detector.  The lead point touching the semiconducting oxide coating (magnetite) on the blade formed a crude point-contact diode.  By carefully adjusting the pencil lead on the surface of the blade, they could find spots capable of rectification.  The sets were dubbed "foxhole radios" by the popular press, and they became part of the folklore of World War II.

In some German-occupied countries during WW2 there were widespread confiscations of radio sets from the civilian population. This led determined listeners to build their own clandestine receivers which often amounted to little more than a basic crystal set. Anyone doing so risked imprisonment or even death if caught, and in most of Europe the signals from the BBC (or other allied stations) were not strong enough to be received on such a set.

"Rocket Radio" 

In the late 1950s, the compact "rocket radio", shaped like a rocket, typically imported from Japan, was introduced, and gained moderate popularity. It used a piezoelectric crystal earpiece (described later in this article), a ferrite core to reduce the size of the tuning coil (also described later), and a small germanium fixed diode, which did not require adjustment. To tune in stations, the user moved the rocket nosepiece, which, in turn, moved a ferrite core inside a coil, changing the inductance in a tuned circuit. Earlier crystal radios suffered from severely reduced Q, and resulting selectivity, from the electrical load of the earphone or earpiece. Furthermore, with its efficient earpiece, the "rocket radio" didn't require a large antenna to gather enough signal. With much higher Q, it could typically tune in several strong local stations, while an earlier radio might only receive one station, possibly with other stations heard in the background.

For listening in areas where an electric outlet was not available, the "rocket radio" served as an alternative to the vacuum tube portable radios of the day, which required expensive, heavy, batteries. Children could hide "rocket radios" under the covers, to listen to radio when their parents thought they were sleeping. Children could take the radios to public swimming pools and listen to radio when they got out of the water, clipping the ground wire to a chain link fence surrounding the pool. The rocket radio was also used as an emergency radio, because it didn't require batteries or an AC outlet.

The rocket radio was available in several rocket styles, as well as other styles that featured the same basic circuit.

Transistor radios had become available at the time, but were expensive. Once those radios dropped in price, the rocket radio declined in popularity.

Later years 

While it never regained the popularity and general use that it enjoyed at its beginnings, the crystal radio circuit is still used. The Boy Scouts have kept the construction of a radio set in their program since the 1920s. A large number of prefabricated novelty items and simple kits could be found through the 1950s and 1960s, and many children with an interest in electronics built one.

Building crystal radios was a craze in the 1920s, and again in the 1950s. Recently, hobbyists have started designing and building examples of the early instruments. Much effort goes into the visual appearance of these sets as well as their performance. Annual crystal radio 'DX' contests (long distance reception) and building contests allow these set owners to compete with each other and form a community of interest in the subject.

Basic principles

A crystal radio can be thought of as a radio receiver reduced to its essentials. It consists of at least these components:

 An antenna in which electric currents are induced by  radio waves.
 A resonant circuit (tuned circuit) which selects the frequency of the desired radio station from all the radio signals received by the antenna. The tuned circuit consists of a coil of wire (called an inductor) and a capacitor connected together. The circuit has a resonant frequency, and allows radio waves at that frequency to pass through to the detector while largely blocking waves at other frequencies. One or both of the coil or capacitor is adjustable, allowing the circuit to be tuned to different frequencies. In some circuits a capacitor is not used and the antenna serves this function, as an antenna that is shorter than a quarter-wavelength of the radio waves it is meant to receive is capacitive.
 A semiconductor crystal detector that demodulates the radio signal to extract the audio signal (modulation).  The crystal detector functions as a square law detector, demodulating the radio frequency alternating current to its audio frequency modulation.  The detector's audio frequency output is converted to sound by the earphone. Early sets used a "cat whisker detector" consisting of a small piece of crystalline mineral such as galena with a fine wire touching its surface. The crystal detector was the component that gave crystal radios their name.  Modern sets use modern semiconductor diodes, although some hobbyists still experiment with crystal or other detectors.
 An earphone to convert the audio signal to sound waves so they can be heard.  The low power produced by a crystal receiver is insufficient to power a loudspeaker, hence earphones are used.

As a crystal radio has no power supply, the sound power produced by the earphone comes solely from the transmitter of the radio station being received, via the radio waves captured by the antenna. The power available to a receiving antenna decreases with the square of its distance from the radio transmitter. Even for a powerful commercial broadcasting station, if it is more than a few miles from the receiver the power received by the antenna is very small, typically measured in microwatts or nanowatts. In modern crystal sets, signals as weak as 50 picowatts at the antenna can be heard. Crystal radios can receive such weak signals without using amplification only due to the great sensitivity of human hearing, which can detect sounds with an intensity of only 10−16 W/cm2. Therefore, crystal receivers have to be designed to convert the energy from the radio waves into sound waves as efficiently as possible. Even so, they are usually only able to receive stations within distances of about 25 miles for AM broadcast stations, although the radiotelegraphy signals used during the wireless telegraphy era could be received at hundreds of miles, and crystal receivers were even used for transoceanic communication during that period.

Design
Commercial passive receiver development was abandoned with the advent of reliable vacuum tubes around 1920, and subsequent crystal radio research was primarily done by radio amateurs and hobbyists. Many different circuits have been used. The following sections discuss the parts of a crystal radio in greater detail.

Antenna 
The antenna converts the energy in the electromagnetic radio waves to an alternating electric current in the antenna, which is connected to the tuning coil. Since, in a crystal radio, all the power comes from the antenna, it is important that the antenna collect as much power from the radio wave as possible. The larger an antenna, the more power it can intercept. Antennas of the type commonly used with crystal sets are most effective when their length is close to a multiple of a quarter-wavelength of the radio waves they are receiving. Since the length of the waves used with crystal radios is very long (AM broadcast band waves are 182–566 m or 597–1857 ft. long) the antenna is made as long as possible, from a long wire, in contrast to the whip antennas or ferrite loopstick antennas used in modern radios.

Serious crystal radio hobbyists use "inverted L" and "T" type antennas, consisting of hundreds of feet of wire suspended as high as possible between buildings or trees, with a feed wire attached in the center or at one end leading down to the receiver. However, more often, random lengths of wire dangling out windows are used. A popular practice in early days (particularly among apartment dwellers) was to use existing large metal objects, such as bedsprings, fire escapes, and barbed wire fences as antennas.

Ground 
The wire antennas used with crystal receivers are monopole antennas which develop their output voltage with respect to ground. The receiver thus requires a connection to ground (the earth) as a return circuit for the current.  The ground wire was attached to a radiator, water pipe, or a metal stake driven into the ground.  In early days if an adequate ground connection could not be made a counterpoise was sometimes used.   A good ground is more important for crystal sets than it is for powered receivers, as crystal sets are designed to have a low input impedance needed to transfer power efficiently from the antenna. A low resistance ground connection (preferably below 25 Ω) is necessary because any resistance in the ground reduces available power from the antenna. In contrast, modern receivers are voltage-driven devices, with high input impedance, hence little current flows in the antenna/ground circuit. Also, mains powered receivers are grounded adequately through their power cords, which are in turn attached to the earth by way of a well established ground.

Tuned circuit 

The tuned circuit, consisting of a coil and a capacitor connected together, acts as a resonator, similar to a tuning fork. Electric charge, induced in the antenna by the radio waves, flows rapidly back and forth between the plates of the capacitor through the coil. The circuit has a high impedance at the desired radio signal's frequency, but a low impedance at all other frequencies.  Hence, signals at undesired frequencies pass through the tuned circuit to ground, while the desired frequency is instead passed on to the detector (diode) and stimulates the earpiece and is heard. The frequency of the station received is the resonant frequency f of the tuned circuit, determined by the capacitance C of the capacitor and the inductance L of the coil:

The circuit can be adjusted to different frequencies by varying the inductance (L), the capacitance (C), or both, "tuning" the circuit to the frequencies of different radio stations.  In the lowest-cost sets, the inductor was made variable via a spring contact pressing against the windings that could slide along the coil, thereby introducing a larger or smaller number of turns of the coil into the circuit, varying the inductance.  Alternatively, a variable capacitor is used to tune the circuit.  Some modern crystal sets use a ferrite core tuning coil, in which a ferrite magnetic core is moved into and out of the coil, thereby varying the inductance by changing the magnetic permeability (this eliminated the less reliable mechanical contact).

The antenna is an integral part of the tuned circuit and its reactance contributes to determining the circuit's resonant frequency. Antennas usually act as a capacitance, as antennas shorter than a quarter-wavelength have capacitive reactance. Many early crystal sets did not have a tuning capacitor, and relied instead on the capacitance inherent in the wire antenna (in addition to significant parasitic capacitance in the coil) to form the tuned circuit with the coil.

The earliest crystal receivers did not have a tuned circuit at all, and just consisted of a crystal detector connected between the antenna and ground, with an earphone across it. Since this circuit lacked any frequency-selective elements besides the broad resonance of the antenna, it had little ability to reject unwanted stations, so all stations within a wide band of frequencies were heard in the earphone (in practice the most powerful usually drowns out the others). It was used in the earliest days of radio, when only one or two stations were within a crystal set's limited range.

Impedance matching 

An important principle used in crystal radio design to transfer maximum power to the earphone is impedance matching. The maximum power is transferred from one part of a circuit to another when the impedance of one circuit is the complex conjugate of that of the other; this implies that the two circuits should have equal resistance. However, in crystal sets, the impedance of the antenna-ground system (around 10-200 ohms) is usually lower than the impedance of the receiver's tuned circuit (thousands of ohms at resonance), and also varies depending on the quality of the ground attachment, length of the antenna, and the frequency to which the receiver is tuned.

Therefore, in improved receiver circuits, in order to match the antenna impedance to the receiver's impedance, the antenna was connected across only a portion of the tuning coil's turns. This made the tuning coil act as an impedance matching transformer (in an autotransformer connection) in addition to providing the tuning function. The antenna's low resistance was increased (transformed) by a factor equal to the square of the turns ratio (the ratio of the number of turns the antenna was connected to, to the total number of turns of the coil), to match the resistance across the tuned circuit. In the "two-slider" circuit, popular during the wireless era, both the antenna and the detector circuit were attached to the coil with sliding contacts, allowing (interactive) adjustment of both the resonant frequency and the turns ratio. Alternatively a multiposition switch was used to select taps on the coil. These controls were adjusted until the station sounded loudest in the earphone.

Problem of selectivity 
One of the drawbacks of crystal sets is that they are vulnerable to interference from stations near in frequency to the desired station. Often two or more stations are heard simultaneously. This is because the simple tuned circuit does not reject nearby signals well; it allows a wide band of frequencies to pass through, that is, it has a large bandwidth (low Q factor) compared to modern receivers, giving the receiver low selectivity.

The crystal detector worsened the problem, because it has relatively low resistance, thus it "loaded" the tuned circuit, drawing significant current and thus damping the oscillations, reducing its Q factor so it allowed through a broader band of frequencies. In many circuits, the selectivity was improved by connecting the detector and earphone circuit to a tap across only a fraction of the coil's turns. This reduced the impedance loading of the tuned circuit, as well as improving the impedance match with the detector.

Inductive coupling 

In more sophisticated crystal receivers, the tuning coil is replaced with an adjustable air core antenna coupling transformer which improves the selectivity by a technique called loose coupling. This
consists of two magnetically coupled coils of wire, one (the primary) attached to the antenna and ground and the other (the secondary) attached to the rest of the circuit. The current from the antenna creates an alternating magnetic field in the primary coil, which induced a current in the secondary coil which was then rectified and powered the earphone. Each of the coils functions as a tuned circuit; the primary coil resonated with the capacitance of the antenna (or sometimes another capacitor), and the secondary coil resonated with the tuning capacitor. Both the primary and secondary were tuned to the frequency of the station.  The two circuits interacted to form a resonant transformer.

Reducing the coupling between the coils, by physically separating them so that less of the magnetic field of one intersects the other, reduces the mutual inductance, narrows the bandwidth, and results in much sharper, more selective tuning than that produced by a single tuned circuit. However, the looser coupling also reduced the power of the signal passed to the second circuit. The transformer was made with adjustable coupling, to allow the listener to experiment with various settings to gain the best reception.

One design common in early days, called a "loose coupler", consisted of a smaller secondary coil inside a larger primary coil. The smaller coil was mounted on a rack so it could be slid linearly in or out of the larger coil. If radio interference was encountered, the smaller coil would be slid further out of the larger, loosening the coupling, narrowing the bandwidth, and thereby rejecting the interfering signal.

The antenna coupling transformer also functioned as an impedance matching transformer, that allowed a better match of the antenna impedance to the rest of the circuit. One or both of the coils usually had several taps which could be selected with a switch, allowing adjustment of the number of turns of that transformer and hence the "turns ratio".

Coupling transformers were difficult to adjust, because the three adjustments, the tuning of the primary circuit, the tuning of the secondary circuit, and the coupling of the coils, were all interactive, and changing one affected the others.

Crystal detector 

The crystal detector demodulates the radio frequency signal, extracting the modulation (the audio signal which represents the sound waves) from the radio frequency carrier wave. In early receivers, a type of crystal detector often used was a "cat whisker detector". The point of contact between the wire and the crystal acted as a semiconductor diode.  The cat whisker detector constituted a crude Schottky diode that allowed current to flow better in one direction than in the opposite direction. Modern crystal sets use modern semiconductor diodes.  The crystal functions as an envelope detector, rectifying the alternating current radio signal to a pulsing direct current, the peaks of which trace out the audio signal, so it can be converted to sound by the earphone, which is connected to the detector.
The rectified current from the detector has radio frequency pulses from the carrier frequency in it, which are blocked by the high inductive reactance and do not pass well through the coils of early date earphones. Hence, a small capacitor called a bypass capacitor is often placed across the earphone terminals; its low reactance at radio frequency bypasses these pulses around the earphone to ground.  In some sets the earphone cord had enough capacitance that this component could be omitted.

Only certain sites on the crystal surface functioned as rectifying junctions, and the device was very sensitive to the pressure of the crystal-wire contact, which could be disrupted by the slightest vibration. Therefore, a usable contact point had to be found by trial and error before each use. The operator dragged the wire across the crystal surface until a radio station or "static" sounds were heard in the earphones.  Alternatively, some radios (circuit, right) used a battery-powered buzzer attached to the input circuit to adjust the detector. The spark at the buzzer's electrical contacts served as a weak source of static, so when the detector began working, the buzzing could be heard in the earphones.  The buzzer was then turned off, and the radio tuned to the desired station.

Galena (lead sulfide) was the most common crystal used, but various other types of crystals were also used, the most common being iron pyrite (fool's gold, FeS2), silicon, molybdenite (MoS2), silicon carbide (carborundum, SiC), and a zincite-bornite (ZnO-Cu5FeS4) crystal-to-crystal junction trade-named Perikon. Crystal radios have also been improvised from a variety of common objects, such as blue steel razor blades and lead pencils, rusty needles, and pennies In these, a semiconducting layer of oxide or sulfide on the metal surface is usually responsible for the rectifying action.

In modern sets, a semiconductor diode is used for the detector, which is much more reliable than a crystal detector and requires no adjustments. Germanium diodes (or sometimes Schottky diodes) are used instead of silicon diodes, because their lower forward voltage drop (roughly 0.3 V compared to 0.6 V) makes them more sensitive.

All semiconductor detectors function rather inefficiently in crystal receivers, because the low voltage input to the detector is too low to result in much difference between forward better conduction direction, and the reverse weaker conduction.  To improve the sensitivity of some of the early crystal detectors, such as silicon carbide, a small forward bias voltage was applied across the detector by a battery and potentiometer.  The bias moves the diode's operating point higher on the detection curve producing more signal voltage at the expense of less signal current (higher impedance). There is a limit to the benefit that this produces, depending on the other impedances of the radio.  This improved sensitivity was caused by moving the DC operating point to a more desirable voltage-current operating point (impedance) on the junction's I-V curve. The battery did not power the radio, but only provided the biasing voltage which required little power.

Earphones 

The requirements for earphones used in crystal sets are different from earphones used with modern audio equipment. They have to be efficient at converting the electrical signal energy to sound waves, while most modern earphones  sacrifice efficiency in order to gain high fidelity reproduction of the sound. In early homebuilt sets, the earphones were the most costly component.

The early earphones used with wireless-era crystal sets had moving iron drivers that worked in a way similar to the horn loudspeakers of the period. Each earpiece contained a permanent magnet about which was a coil of wire which formed a second  electromagnet. Both magnetic poles were close to a steel diaphragm of the speaker. When the audio signal from the radio was passed through the electromagnet's windings, current was caused to flow in the coil which created a varying magnetic field that augmented or diminished that due to the permanent magnet. This varied the force of attraction on the diaphragm, causing it to vibrate. The vibrations of the diaphragm push and pull on the air in front of it, creating sound waves. Standard headphones used in telephone work had a low impedance, often 75 Ω, and required more current than a crystal radio could supply. Therefore, the type used with crystal set radios (and other sensitive equipment) was wound with more turns of finer wire giving it a high impedance of 2000-8000 Ω.

Modern crystal sets use piezoelectric crystal earpieces, which are much more sensitive and also smaller. They consist of a piezoelectric crystal with electrodes attached to each side, glued to a light diaphragm. When the audio signal from the radio set is applied to the electrodes, it causes the crystal to vibrate, vibrating the diaphragm. Crystal earphones are designed as ear buds that plug directly into the ear canal of the wearer, coupling the sound more efficiently to the eardrum. Their resistance is much higher (typically megohms) so they do not greatly "load" the tuned circuit, allowing increased selectivity of the receiver. The piezoelectric earphone's higher resistance, in parallel with its capacitance of around 9 pF, creates a  filter that allows the passage of low frequencies, but blocks the higher frequencies. In that case a bypass capacitor is not needed (although in practice a small one of around 0.68 to 1 nF is often used to help improve quality), but instead a 10–100 kΩ resistor must be added in parallel with the earphone's input.

Although the low power produced by crystal radios is typically insufficient to drive a loudspeaker, some homemade 1960s sets have used one, with an audio transformer to match the low impedance of the speaker to the circuit.  Similarly, modern low-impedance (8 Ω) earphones cannot be used unmodified in crystal sets because the receiver does not produce enough current to drive them. They are sometimes used by adding an audio transformer to match their impedance with the higher impedance of the driving antenna circuit.

Use as a power source 

A crystal radio tuned to a strong local transmitter can be used as a power source for a second amplified receiver of a distant station that cannot be heard without amplification.

There is a long history of unsuccessful attempts and unverified claims to recover the power in the carrier of the received signal itself. Traditional crystal sets use half-wave rectifiers. As AM signals have a modulation factor of only 30% by voltage at peaks, no more than 9% of received signal power is actual audio information, and 91% is just rectified DC voltage. <correction> The 30% figure is the standard used for radio testing, and is based on the average modulation factor for speech. Properly-designed and managed AM transmitters can be run to 100% modulation on peaks without causing distortion or "splatter" (excess sideband energy that radiates outside of the intended signal bandwidth). Given that the audio signal is unlikely to be at peak all the time, the ratio of energy is, in practice, even greater. Considerable effort was made to convert this DC voltage into sound energy. Some earlier attempts include a one-transistor amplifier in 1966. Sometimes efforts to recover this power are confused with other efforts to produce a more efficient detection. This history continues now with designs as elaborate as "inverted two-wave switching power unit".

Gallery

See also 

 Batteryless radio
 Camille Papin Tissot
 Coherer
 Demodulator
 Detector (radio)
 Electrolytic detector
 History of radio
 The Crystal Set Perfected

References

Further reading 
 Ellery W. Stone (1919). Elements of Radiotelegraphy. D. Van Nostrand company. 267 pages.
 Elmer Eustice Bucher (1920). The Wireless Experimenter's Manual: Incorporating how to Conduct a Radio Club.
 Milton Blake Sleeper (1922). Radio Hook-ups: A Reference and Record Book of Circuits Used for Connecting Wireless Instruments. The Norman W. Henley publishing co.; 67 pages.
 JL Preston and HA Wheeler (1922) "Construction and operation of a simple homemade radio receiving outfit", Bureau of Standards, C-120: Apr. 24, 1922.
 PA Kinzie (1996). Crystal Radio: History, Fundamentals, and Design. Xtal Set Society.
 Thomas H. Lee (2004). The Design of CMOS Radio-Frequency Integrated Circuits
 Derek K. Shaeffer and Thomas H. Lee (1999). The Design and Implementation of Low-Power CMOS Radio Receivers
 Ian L. Sanders. Tickling the Crystal – Domestic British Crystal Sets of the 1920s; Volumes 1–5. BVWS Books (2000–2010).

External links 

 A website with lots of information on early radio and crystal sets
 Hobbydyne Crystal Radios History and Technical Information on Crystal Radios
 Ben Tongue's Technical Talk Section 1 links to "Crystal Radio Set Systems: Design, Measurements and Improvement".
 "Semiconductor archeology or tribute to unknown precursors ". earthlink.net/~lenyr.
 Nyle Steiner K7NS, Zinc Negative Resistance RF Amplifier for Crystal Sets and Regenerative Receivers Uses No Tubes or Transistors. November 20, 2002.
 Crystal Set DX? Roger Lapthorn G3XBM
 Details of crystals used in crystal sets
 
 http://www.crystal-radio.eu/endiodes.htm Diodes
 http://www.crystal-radio.eu/engev.htm How to build a sensitive crystal receiver?
 http://uv201.com/Radio_Pages/Pre-1921/crystal_detectors.htm Crystal Detectors
 http://www.sparkmuseum.com/DETECTOR.HTM Radio Detectors

History of radio
Radio electronics
Types of radios
Amateur radio receivers
Receiver (radio)
Electronic design
Bangladeshi inventions
Indian inventions